Morten is a common given name in Norway and Denmark. Approximately 22,138 have this name as a given name in Norway and about 52 people have it as a surname. Notable people with the name include:

Morten Abel, Norwegian singer
Morten Andersen, Danish kicker in American football
Morten Arnfred, Danish film director and screenwriter
Morten Berglia, Norwegian orienteering competitor
Morten Berre, Norwegian footballer
Morten Bertolt, Danish footballer
Morten Bisgaard, Danish footballer
Morten Bo, Danish photographer
Morten Breum, Danish DJ and producer known by his mononym Morten
Morten Bruun, Danish football player
Morten Brørs, Norwegian cross-country skier
Morten Børup, Danish educator
Morten Stig Christensen, Danish handball player, TV host and TV executive
Morten Daland, Norwegian handball player
Morten Djupvik, Norwegian show jumping competitor
Morten Dons, Danish racing driver
Morten Eriksen, Norwegian footballer
Morten Finstad, Norwegian ice hockey player
Morten Frisch, Danish epidemiologist
Morten Frost, Danish badminton player and coach
Morten Furuly, Norwegian musician
Morten Grunwald, Danish actor and theater manager
Morten Harket, Norwegian singer and leader of the band a-ha
Morten Hegreberg, Norwegian cyclist
Morten Konradsen, Norwegian footballer
Morten Korch, Danish author
Morten Krogvold, Norwegian photographer and writer
Morten Lange, Danish botanist and politician
Morten Lauridsen, American composer
Morten Løkkegaard, Danish journalist and TV host
Morten Messerschmidt, Danish politician
Morten Moldskred, Norwegian footballer
Morten Olsen, Danish football player and coach
Morten Gamst Pedersen, Norwegian footballer
Morten Helveg Petersen, Danish politician
Morten Nielsen (disambiguation)
Morten Nordstrand, Danish footballer
Morten Rasmussen (disambiguation)
Morten Rieker, Norwegian sailor
Morten Ristorp, Danish musician
Morten Schakenda, Norwegian chef
Morten Skoubo, Danish football player
Morten Thorsby, Norwegian footballer
Morten Wieghorst, Danish football player
Morten Wormskjold, Danish botanist and explorer
Morten Østergaard, Former Danish minister for Science
Morten Veland, Norwegian musician
Morten Vågen, Norwegian author

References

See also
Morton (given name)

Danish masculine given names
Faroese masculine given names
Norwegian masculine given names

pl:Morten